Yves Cape (born November 1, 1960) is a Belgian cinematographer. He is a member of French Society of Cinematographers.

Career 
Yves Cape studied at the INSAS film school in Brussels. After having started out as an assistant he made his debut as cinematographer on short films in the 90’s. His encounter with Alain Berliner on the short film Rose (1993) led to the signing for the photography of the feature Ma vie en rose. He has worked with notable film directors such as Bruno Dumont, Claire Denis, Patrice Chéreau, Cédric Kahn, Martin Provost, Bertrand Bonello and Guillaume Nicloux.

Selected filmography 
 2022: Un alibi
 2022: Irréductible
 2021: Sundown
 2021: Peaceful
 2020: New Order
 2019: Happy Birthday
 2019: Zombi Child
 2019: Twice Upon a Time
 2018: Ad Vitam
 2018: The Prayer
 2017: April's Daughter
 2017: The Midwife
 2016: Orphan
 2016: The Wounded Angel
 2015: Call My Agent!
 2015: Chronic
 2014: Two Men in Town
 2013: The Nun
 2012: Holy Motors
 2011: Love Lasts Three Years
 2011: The First Man
 2011: Hors Satan
 2013: Hadewijch

References
The information in this article is based on that in its French equivalent.

External links
 

Belgian cinematographers
Living people
1960 births